Francesco Massucci (1610 – September 1656) was a Roman Catholic prelate who served as Bishop of Penne e Atri (1610–1656).

Biography
Francesco Massucci was born in Recanati, Italy in 1610. On 18 May 1648, he was appointed during the papacy of Pope Innocent X as Bishop of Penne e Atri. On 1 June 1648, he was consecrated bishop by Alfonso de la Cueva-Benavides y Mendoza-Carrillo, Cardinal-Bishop of Palestrina, with Giovanni Battista Scanaroli, Titular Bishop of Sidon, and Stefano Martini, Bishop of Noli, serving as co-consecrators. He served as Bishop of Penne e Atri until his death in September 1656.

References

External links and additional sources
 (Chronology of Bishops) 
 (Chronology of Bishops) 

17th-century Italian Roman Catholic bishops
Bishops appointed by Pope Innocent X
1610 births
1656 deaths